Sobrado Abbey, ( or ) is a Cistercian monastery in the province of La Coruña, Galicia, Spain. It is situated in the municipality of Sobrado, about 9 km east of Corredoiras and about 46 km southeast of Betanzos, at an altitude of 540 m above sea level.

History
The abbey was founded in 952 by Count Hermenegildo Alóitez and his wife Paterna. In 958, the founders transferred the county of Présaras to the monastery and, in that same year, Hermenegildo retired there where he lived as a monk the rest of his life and where he was buried.  The abbey was inherited by his descendants and nearly two centuries later, in January 1142, the brothers Fernando and Bermudo Pérez, two of the most distinguished members of the House of Traba, handed it over to the Cistercian monks  from Clairvaux. The abbey flourished during the 12th and 13th centuries and was able to undertake the foundations of its own daughter house, Valdedios Abbey in Asturias. Sobrado was also given the supervision of Monfero Abbey after it joined the Cistercian Order.

After a period of decline, in 1498 Sobrado was the first abbey in Galicia to join the Castilian Cistercian Congregation.

The monumental new Baroque abbey church was dedicated in 1708. Most of the conventual buildings were also rebuilt at this time.

The dissolution of the monasteries enforced by the government of Mendizábal in 1835 put an end to the abbey, and the abandoned buildings fell into decay.

In 1954 the Cistercian  (Trappist) monks of Viaceli Abbey in Cóbreces, west of Santander, began reconstruction, having already refounded and restored Huerta Abbey in 1929, and were able to resettle the monastery with a new community in 1966.

Buildings 

The present abbey church, now roofed with a number of domes and cupolas, was built at the end of the 17th century, although the Magdalene Chapel (Capela da Madalena or Capilla de la Magdalena) dates from the 14th century. The sacristy was built by Juan de Herrera. The monastery has three cloisters. The kitchen and the chapter house remain of the medieval monastic buildings.

References

Bibliography

External links 

 Website of Sobrado Abbey  [Broken link]
 Website of the Municipio de Sobrado, with information on and pictures of the abbey 

Christian monasteries established in the 12th century
17th-century Roman Catholic church buildings in Spain
20th-century Christian monasteries
Monasteries in Galicia (Spain)
Cistercian monasteries in Spain
Benedictine monasteries in Spain
Baroque architecture in Galicia (Spain)
Trappist monasteries in Spain
Bien de Interés Cultural landmarks in the Province of A Coruña